Victor Joseph Hugo Jr.  (28 May 1931 – 11 May 2020) was a major general in the United States Army. He served as Commanding General of the 32nd Army Air Defense Command. Raised in Marblehead, Massachusetts, he graduated from the United States Military Academy in 1954.

References

1931 births
2020 deaths
United States Army generals
Burials at Arlington National Cemetery